The 2021 AMA National Speedway Championship Series was staged over two rounds, held at Owego, New York (September 5) and Auburn, California (September 25). Three rounds were initially scheduled, however the first round at Greene, New York was cancelled due to poor track conditions. It was also the first championship since 2019, after the 2020 series was not held due to the Covid-19 pandemic.

It was won by Max Ruml, who beat Gino Manzares and Billy Janniro to the title. It was the first time Ruml had won the title, having previously finished as runner-up on four separate occasions.

Event format 
Over the course of 20 heats, each rider raced against every other rider once. The top eight scorers then reached the semi-finals, with first and second in those semi-finals reaching the final. Points were scored for every ride taken, including the semi-finals and final.

Final Classification

References 

AMA
AMA National Speedway Championship
AMA
AMA